Jana Müller Gerisch (born 24 May 1978 in Parchim) is a female German volleyball player who played for the German Women's National Team.

She played at the 2002 FIVB Volleyball Women's World Championship in Germany, and at the 2003 Women's European Volleyball Championship. 
On club level she played with Schweriner SC.

Career
Jana Gerisch grew up in Matzlow at Parchim in, and began her career at SV progress Neustadt-Glewe. 
In 1990, at the age of twelve, she moved to Schwerin SC and joined the first team in 1997. 
In addition to various youth and junior titles, she won four German championship titles with the SSC and once the DVV Cup. 
From 2004, she played successfully for the Dresdner SC in the Bundesliga, with which she again became German champion in 2007. In addition, she won the DVV Cup and the Challenge Cup in 2010 with the DSC.
In June 2009, she married Felix Gerisch and adopted his surname. 
After the 2009/10 season she finished her career.

References

External links 

German women's volleyball players
1978 births
Living people
People from Parchim
Sportspeople from Mecklenburg-Western Pomerania